Baby Blues is a 2012 Polish drama film directed by Katarzyna Rosłaniec. The story is raising the problem of teenage mothers, who allegedly think that a baby is just an addition to clothes and hairstyle.

Plot
Natalia is a seventeen-year-old living in Warsaw. She has a child with Jakub, but neither of the parents can take care of the baby.

Cast
 Magdalena Berus as Natalia
 Nikodem Rozbicki as Jakub
 Klaudia Bułka as Martyna
 Magdalena Boczarska as Marzena, Natalia's mother
 Jan Frycz as Jakub's father
 Danuta Stenka as Jakubs' mother

References

External links
 
Baby Blues at culture.pl

2012 films
2010s Polish-language films
2012 drama films
Polish drama films